The 2007 Speedway Grand Prix of Latvia was the eighth race of the 2007 Speedway Grand Prix season. It took place on 25 August in the Latvijas Spīdveja Centrs stadium in Daugavpils, Latvia.

Starting positions draw 
The Speedway Grand Prix Commission has nominated Grigory Laguta (as wild card), Kasts Poudzuks and Maksims Bogdanow (both as track reserve). Kai Laukkanen  has replace the injured Jarosław Hampel.

(4) Andreas Jonsson (Sweden)
(2) Greg Hancock (United States)
(9) Jarosław Hampel (Poland) → (20) Kai Laukkanen (Finland)
(7) Matej Žagar (Slovenia)
(15) Chris Harris (United Kingdom)
(1) Jason Crump (Australia)
(8) Tomasz Gollob (Poland)
(13) Wiesław Jaguś (Poland)
(11) Scott Nicholls (United Kingdom)
(6) Hans N. Andersen (Denmark)
(3) Nicki Pedersen (Denmark)
(5) Leigh Adams (Australia)
(10) Antonio Lindbäck (Sweden)
(16) Grigory Laguta (Russia)
(12) Bjarne Pedersen (Denmark)
(14) Rune Holta (Poland)
(17) Kasts Poudzuks (Latvia)
(18) Maksims Bogdanovs (Latvia)

Laguta was started with Latvian licence.

Heat details

Heat after heat 
 Jonsson, Žagar, Laukkanen, Hancock (d)
 Gollob, Jaguś, Harris, Crump
 N. Pedersen, Adams, Nicholls, Andersen (u/w)
 Łaguta, B. Pedersen, Holta, Lindbäck (u/w)
 Nicholls, Jonsson, Harris, Puodżuks (za Lindbäcka)
 Andersen, Crump, Łaguta, Hancock
 N. Pedersen, B. Pedersen, Gollob, Laukkanen
 Jaguś, Adams, Holta, Žagar
 Crump, Holta, N. Pedersen, Jonsson
 Adams, B. Pedersen, Harris, Hancock
 Łaguta, Nicholls, Jaguś, Laukkanen
 Gollob, Andersen, Bogdanow (za Lindbäcka), Žagar
 Adams, Gollob, Jonsson, Łaguta
 N. Pedersen, Jaguś, Puodżuks (za Lindbäcka), Hancock (d)
 Holta, Laukkanen, Harris (3u), Andersen (u/w)
 Nicholls, Crump, B. Pedersen, Žagar
 Jaguś, Jonsson, B. Pedersen, Andersen (d)
 Hancock, Nicholls, Gollob, Holta
 Adams, Crump, Bogdanow (za Lindbäcka), Laukkanen
 Harris, N. Pedersen, Łaguta, Žagar
 Semi-Finals:
 Adams, Gollob, Crump, Łaguta
 N. Pedersen, Nicholls, Jaguś, Jonsson
 Final:
 Adams, N. Pedersen, Gollob, Nicholls

The intermediate classification

See also 
 List of Speedway Grand Prix riders

References 

Latvia
Speedway Grand Prix of Latvia
2007 in Latvian sport